Opera Philadelphia (prior to 2013 Opera Company of Philadelphia (OCP)) is an American opera company in Philadelphia, Pennsylvania and is the city's only company producing grand opera. The organization produces one festival in September (Festival O) and additional operas in the spring season, encompassing works from the 17th through the 21st century. The famed Academy of Music, the oldest opera house to be continuously in use for its original purpose within the United States, is currently the venue for three of the company's performances. The company is led by David Devan, who was appointed general director in 2011.

History
The Opera Company of Philadelphia was established in 1975 with the merger of the Philadelphia Lyric Opera Company (PLOC) and the Philadelphia Grand Opera Company (PGOC); two organizations which had competed with one another for many years. Adele W. Paxson, who headed the PLOC, was appointed the first president of the company's board, a position she held for many years. Max Leon, conductor and general manager of the PGOC, became the company's first general manager, and Carl Suppa became the company's first artistic director. All three individuals were largely responsible for arranging, planning, and executing the merger. In 1976 the company presented the world premiere of Gian Carlo Menotti's The Hero.

At the end of the 1977–1978 season both Leon and Suppa left the company. As a result, J. Edward Corn was appointed the company's second general manager; subsequently Julius Rudel became an artistic consultant for the company. In 1980, Corn left the company to become the director of the National Endowment for the Arts' new opera and musical theater program. Margaret Anne Everett, the OCP's director of educational and community services since 1977, was initially appointed the company's acting manager and then officially became the company's third general manager. She remained in that position for fourteen years.

In March 1990 Everett resigned from her post and Jane Grey Nemeth, the then director of the OCP's Luciano Pavarotti International Voice Competition, became the company's acting general director. In January 1991 the company named Robert B. Driver its general director. The company's management structure has changed several times during Driver's time with the company, he previously served as the title artistic director from 2000 to 2004 and general and artistic director from 2004 to 2009. On March 31, 2009 it was announced that Driver would return to the post of artistic director, and David B. Devan, the OCP's managing director since January 2006, would serve as the OCP's executive director. Devan was appointed general director in February 2011.

In 2013 the OCP renamed itself Opera Philadelphia and adopted a new logo.

References

Notes

Other sources
David Patrick Stearns, "The Philadelphia Story: Things are looking up, operatically speaking, in the City of Brotherly Love", Opera News (New York), Vol. 78, No. 9, March 2014

External links
 

Musical groups established in 1975
Culture of Philadelphia
Philadelphia
Musical groups from Philadelphia
1975 establishments in Pennsylvania